The Very Eye of Night is 1955 American experimental silent short film written and directed by Maya Deren, and her last completed film. Made in collaboration with Metropolitan Opera Ballet School, the film was shot in black-and-white in the 16 mm format, and is projected as photographed in the negative.

The Very of Eye of Night premiered in Port-au-Prince, Haiti, in 1955. It later screened in New York in 1959, with an added musical score by Teiji Ito.

Cast
 Don Freisinger as Gemini
 Richard Sandifer as Gemini
 Patricia Ferrier as Ariel
 Bud Bready as Oberon
 Genaro Gomez as Umbriel
 Barbara Levin as Titania
 Richard Englund as Uranus
 Rosemary Williams as Urania
 Phillip Salem as Noctambulo

Release
The Very Eye of Night was made between 1952 and 1955 in collaboration with choreographer Antony Tudor. The film first premiered in Port-au-Prince, Haiti, in 1955. It later screened in New York in 1959, by which time music by Teiji Ito was added.

In 1990, the film was released on DVD in the United States by Mystic Fire Video.

References

External links
 
 
 Stills From The Very Eye of Night by Deren, Maya director from Anthology Film Archives

1958 films
1958 short films
1950s avant-garde and experimental films
American avant-garde and experimental films
American black-and-white films
Films directed by Maya Deren
1950s American films